Carmi is a surname and a given name.  It may be of Hebrew origin:  and as such sometimes transliterated as Karmi. Notable people with the surname include:

Hebrew
Carmi Gillon, Israeli politician
Ayelet Carmi,  Israeli painter and installation artist
Boris Carmi, Russian-born Israeli photographer
Israel Carmi, founder of the Tilhas Tizig Gesheften (TTG Brigade)
Dov Karmi,  architect of Mandate Palestine and Israel
Lior Karmi
Mordecai Karmi
Rhea Carmi, Israeli American abstract expressionist and mixed-media artist
Ram Karmi, Israeli architect
 Rivka Carmi (born 1948), Israeli pediatrician, geneticist, and President of Ben-Gurion University of the Negev
T. Carmi,  literary pseudonym of Carmi Charney, an American-born Israeli poet

Other
Carmi le Roux, South African cricketer
Carmi Martin, Carmita Martin, Filipina actress, model, and comedian
Carmi Schooler, American social psychologist
Carmi Thompson,  American attorney and Republican politician
Carmi W. Beach, American merchant, Republican politician, and Wisconsin pioneer
Eugenio Carmi, Italian painter and sculptor
Lisetta Carmi, Italian photographer
Maria Carmi, stage name of Norina Matchabelli
Vera Carmi,  Italian film actress